The Gimnasio Josué Neri Santos is an indoor arena located in Ciudad Juárez, Chihuahua. It is currently used mostly for Basketball matches and can seat about 8,000 people.

References

External links

Josué Neri Santos
Volleyball venues in Mexico
Basketball venues in Mexico
Sports venues in Chihuahua (state)